Box Office 3D: The Filmest of Films is a 2011 Italian parody film directed by Ezio Greggio.

The film premiered out of competition at the 68th Venice International Film Festival on 30 August 2011. Parodies include The Da Vinci Code, The Godfather and gangster films, Twilight, slasher films, Gladiator, Fast & Furious, Grease, James Bond films, Das Boot, Zorro, Avatar, Harry Potter films and The Lord of the Rings trilogy.

Cast

References

External links

2011 films
Films directed by Ezio Greggio
2010s Italian-language films
2011 comedy films
2010s parody films
Italian parody films
Italian comedy films
Films with screenplays by Rudy De Luca
2010s Italian films